Tin cry is the characteristic sound heard when a bar made of tin is bent. Variously described as a "screaming" or "crackling" sound, the effect is caused by the crystal twinning in the metal. The sound is not particularly loud, despite terms like "crying" and "screaming".  It is very noticeable when a hot-dip tin coated sheet metal is bent at high speed over rollers during processing.

Tin cry is often demonstrated using a simple science experiment. A bar of tin will "cry" repeatedly when bent until it breaks. The experiment can then be recycled by melting and recrystallizing the metal. The low melting point of tin   - makes re-casting easy. Tin anneals at reasonably-low temperature as well, normalizing tin's microstructure of crystallites/grains.

Although the cry is most typical of tin, a similar effect occurs in other metals, such as niobium, indium, zinc, cadmium, gallium, and solid mercury.

References

External links
Tin cry on YouTube
Mercury cry on YouTube

Tin
Materials degradation
Fracture mechanics